The Wawelberg Bank Building in St. Petersburg, Russia was built by the Wawelbergs - a prominent Polish banking family active in the Russian Empire. Although this building bears initials HW (Hipolit Wawelberg), it was commissioned by his son, Michael Wawelberg.

The Wawelberg Bank Building is an object of cultural heritage of federal significance.

History 
The building was completed in 1912 and incorporates the foundation and some of the structure of two separate 18th century buildings.  In the 18th century the property owners were two brothers, Semen (Semion) Bernikov and Sergei Bernikov, both wealthy merchants. In the early 19th century one T. Roby (Thomas Roby, Robbie, Т.Роби), a British subject, ran a restaurant or pub in this building. Around the 1850s Bernikov's heirs sold one building to Shchepetilova, and  the second structure to some Nochbeck. New owners in turn later sold the structure to Nikolai (Nicholas) and Karl Korpus (Charles Corpus) who remained landlords until they sold both properties to Wawelberg interests in the early 20th century.

Architecture 
The structure is a heavy Italianate palazzo built on gargantuan scale - it occupies a full city block. The exterior of the building is made of gray granite. Walls, cornices, columns are richly decorated with northern art nouveau inspired sculptures and bas-reliefs. Many contemporaries considered the building too American, too tasteless, and its appearance generated some heated public debate.

References 

 Naom Sindalovskii - St. Petersburg, from Building to Building, 2002, Наум Синдаловский, Петербург от Дома к Дому. 2002
 Naom Sindalovskii - St. Petersburg Biographical Dictionary, 2002, Наум Синдаловский, Биографический словарь, 2002
 Nevsky Prospekt - the architectural guide (Boris Kirikov, Ludmila Kirikova, Olga Petrova) - Centropoligraph, Moscow, 2004 -(Невский проспект - Архитектурный путеводитель, Б. М. Кириков, Л.А. Кирикова, О.В. Петрова), Центрополиграф, Москва, 2004

Buildings and structures in Saint Petersburg
Aeroflot
Art Nouveau architecture in Saint Petersburg
Art Nouveau commercial buildings
Commercial buildings completed in 1912
Bank buildings in Russia
1912 establishments in the Russian Empire
Nevsky Prospekt
Cultural heritage monuments of federal significance in Saint Petersburg